The 1994 season is the 8th season of the league that began on January 8, 1994, and concluded with the championship game on April 16.  In this season, a game between the Detroit Turbos and Philadelphia Wings, was the only game in MILL history to be called off exclusively for fighting.

Team movement
The only change in teams from the 1993 MILL season to 1994 was the loss of the Pittsburgh Bulls.

Regular season

All Star Game
No All-Star Game was played in 1994.

Playoffs

Awards

Weekly awards
In 1994, the MILL began awarding "Player of the Week" honours.

Monthly awards
An award is also given out monthly for the best overall player.

All-Pro Teams
First Team:
Gary Gait, Philadelphia
Paul Gait, Philadelphia
Tim Soudan, Boston
John Tavares, Buffalo
Jim Veltman, Buffalo
Dallas Eliuk, Philadelphia (goalie)

Second Team:
Stu Aird, Buffalo
 Thomas Carmean, Boston
Lindsey Dixon, Baltimore
Ted Dowling, Detroit
Kevin Finneran, Philadelphia
Sal LoCascio, New York (goalie)

Statistics leaders
Bold numbers indicate new single-season records. Italics indicate tied single-season records.

See also
 1994 in sports

References
1994 Archive at the Outsider's Guide to the NLL

MILL
Major Indoor Lacrosse League seasons